Beek is a town and municipality in the southeastern Netherlands, in the province of Limburg. As of 2012, Beek has a population of about 16,400, of which about 8,800 live in the town of Beek.

The municipality of Beek makes part of the region of South Limburg and lies between the city of Geleen in the north and Maastricht in the south, and lies furthermore southeast of interchange Kerensheide and the chemical industries of Chemelot. The Keutelbeek flows through and has its source in the municipality of Beek.

Population centres 
Settlements in the municipality of Beek (population within brackets on 1 January 2005).

Town:
 Beek (8,770)

History 
In 1982, Spaubeek merged with Beek and the municipality got his current size. In 2005, an archaeological site was found between Beek and Neerbeek, consisting of the remainings of a settlement from 5,000 BC. Because of this, Beek is considered the eldest village in the Netherlands.

Buildings 
Noteworthy buildings:
 Sint-Hubertusmolen, (Mill of Saint Hubertus) in Klein Genhout, dated 1801-1802
 Sint-Hubertuskerk, (Church of Saint Hubertus) in Groot Genhout, by architect Alphons Boosten
 Kasteel Genbroek, a castle near Geverik

Transportation 
The municipality of Beek is surrounded by A2 motorway (Amsterdam-Belgian border) in the west and A76 motorway (Belgian border-German border) in the north.

The municipality has two railway stations:
 Beek-Elsloo railway station in the west
 Spaubeek railway station in the east

Beek also contains an airport:
 Maastricht Aachen Airport in the south

Economy 
When KLM exel operated, its head office was on the grounds of Maastricht Aachen Airport in Beek. When V Bird operated, its head office was on the grounds of the airport.

Politics 
The municipal council of Beek has 17 seats.

The executive board (2018-Current) consists of five persons:
Mayor:
 Christine van Basten - Boddin, (D66) 2015 - Current
Aldermen:
 Thijs van Es (BBB-NDB)
 Hub Schoenmakers (BBB-NDB)
 Ralph Diederen (CDA)
 Hub Hodzelmans (CDA)

Notable people 
 Pyke Koch (1901–1991), a Dutch artist who painted in a magic realist manner
 Léon Frissen (born 1950), a Dutch politician, Queen's Commissioner of the province of Limburg 
 Marc Borghans (born 1960), a Dutch runner
 Frans Weekers (born 1967), a Dutch politician and lawyer, Mayor of Beek 2015 to 2016
 Ralf Krewinkel (born 1974), a Dutch politician, Mayor of Beek 2011 to 2015
 Esther de Lange (born 1975 in Spaubeek), a Dutch politician, Member of the European Parliament since 2007
 Maud Welzen (born 1993), a Dutch model

Gallery

References 
Notes

Bibliography 
 Nederland Dichterbij: Limburg, Reader's Digest, 1995

External links 

  

 
Municipalities of Limburg (Netherlands)
Populated places in Limburg (Netherlands)
South Limburg (Netherlands)